Hip Hop History is a collaboration album by Master P and his son, Romeo Miller. It includes guest performances by Tank, Lil Boosie, Playa, Bblak, Mizz Kitty, Young V and Marques Houston. The album has approximately 70,000 units.

Track listing
 "My Life" (feat. Mizz Kitty & Playa) (Prod by I.N.F.O.) 5:07
 "Love My Mama" (feat. Tank) 3:21
 "I Hope She Likes Me" 2:38
 "Rainman" (Prod. by Reco Lynch) 2:59
 "Rock It" (feat. Mizz Kitty) 3:08
 "I Like That" 3:03
 "Outchere" (feat. Mizz Kitty & Playa) (Prod by Raphael RJ2 ) 3:54
 "Stay Ready" (feat. Mizz Kitty & Blakk) 4:09
 "Side Kick" (feat. Playa) 4:05
 "I Got That Work" 2:47
 "Money Don't Make Me" (feat. Blakk) 4:39
 "Let The Kids Grow" 3:54
 "Be Like You" (feat. Forrest Lipton) 3:31
 "Special Girl (Remix)" (feat. Marques Houston) 4:50
 "Im So Fly" (feat. Young V) 3:48
 "Ballin" 3:12
 "Country" (feat. Lil' Boosie & Bengie) 4:34
 "Can't Please Em All" 5:38
 "Black History" 3:27

2007 albums
Master P albums
Romeo Miller albums
Collaborative albums